Atari Connection was a magazine for owners of Atari 8-bit family home computers published by Atari, Inc.'s Computer Division. Editions were quarterly from the spring of 1981 to the summer of 1984 when the company was sold to Jack Tramiel. There was also a one-off "Welcome Edition" a few pages long prior to the spring 1981 edition. Including the Welcome, a total of 15 editions were produced.

The magazine contained a mixture of news, generally fawning software and book reviews, and technical articles at a mixture of skill levels. One recurring feature was "Find the Bug" contest, which generally resulted in a winner receiving a game cartridge.

Over its history, a number of well-known authors submitted articles to the magazine, including Tom Hudson.

See also
Atari Age

References

External link
 Atari Connection

Video game magazines published in the United States
Magazines established in 1981
Magazines disestablished in 1984
Atari
Defunct computer magazines published in the United States
Atari 8-bit computer magazines
Quarterly magazines published in the United States